Haywards Heath Rugby Football Club is an English rugby union team.  The first XV currently plays in Sussex 2, the tenth tier of English rugby union competition. The club also has a number of other teams, with their 2nd XV currently playing in the Sussex Late Red 3 (level 12). They used to run a 4th Team called "The Dinos" named after the dinosaur fossil discovered by Gideon Mantell on what is now their playing fields.

Club honours

1st Team:
Sussex 1 champions: 1992–93
London 2 South champions (2): 2000–01, 2007–08
London 1 v South West 1 promotion playoff winners: 2002–03
Shepherd Neame Kent 1 v Sussex Spitfire 1 promotion playoff winners: 2015–16
London 2 South East champions: 2019–2020.

2nd Team:
Sussex 2 champions: 2014–15 
Sussex Late Red 3 champions: 2015–16

Club colours
The current club colours are black and red hoops.

Notable former players

Haywards Heath have a long-standing record of developing players who go on to play professional rugby. These include the following players :

  Adam Vander - England A, Bath, Richmond, Bristol
   Ben Broster - Wales, Northampton RFC
  Joe Marler - England, Harlequins
  Billy Twelvetrees - British & Irish Lions, England, Leicester Tigers, Gloucester Rugby
  Roy Winters - England, Harlequins, Bristol
  Nick Killick - Harlequins
  Ollie Tomasczczyk - Worcester Warriors, Falcons
  Ben Maidment - Cornish Pirates, Esher
  Perry Parker - Esher, Edinburgh
  Ross Chisholm - Harlequins
  James Chisholm - Harlequins

See also
Sussex RFU

Notes

References

Rugby clubs established in 1950
English rugby union teams
Rugby union in West Sussex
Haywards Heath